Torben Storm (born 13 September 1946) is a Danish retired football player and coach who played as a right midfielder.

He played one game for the Denmark under-19 national team in 1964.

References

Hareide dropper Olsens assistenter‚ bold.dk, 5 February 2016

1946 births
Living people
Danish men's footballers
Association football midfielders
Kjøbenhavns Boldklub players
Akademisk Boldklub players
Danish football managers
Næstved Boldklub managers
Landskrona BoIS managers
Odense Boldklub managers
F.C. Copenhagen non-playing staff
Fremad Amager managers